Highway 705 is a highway in the Canadian province of Saskatchewan that connects Highway 358 at Wood Mountain in the Rural Municipality of Old Post No. 43 to Highway 47 in Rural Municipality of Benson No. 35.

Communities and attractions 
Highway 705 provides access to several communities and attractions.
Communities
 Wood Mountain
 Willow Bunch
 Harptree
 Bengough
 Colgate (nearby)
 Goodwater (nearby)
 Halbrite
Attractions
 Wood Mountain Regional Park
 Wood Mountain Post Provincial Park
 St. Victor Petroglyphs Provincial Park
 Willow Bunch Lake
 Long Creek
 Souris River

Travel route 

Highway 705 begins at Highway 358 at Wood Mountain in the Rural Municipality of Old Post No. 43. This location is the route to the east entrance to the Wood Mountain Post Historic Park. The highway has a general bearing of west to east, however at Km 0.00, Highway 705 begins in a southerly direction, and then at Km 2.4, it turns east. At Km 22.8, Highway 705 turns north until Km 24.0 when it returns to an easterly heading. The intersection with Highway 2 is attained at Km 34.6, which locates the village of Scout Lake. Highway 2 extends to the north and provides access to the Victor Petroglyphs Historic Park. At Km 36.7, the highway turns north and is travels through the RM of Willow Bunch. The highway returns to the easterly course at Km 49.8. At Km 58.4, Highway 705 begins a short northern bearing concurrency with Highway 36 through the town of Willow Bunch. At Km 59.2, the concurrency ends when Highway 705 turns to the east once more. At Km 75.0, the highway turns south until Km 82.2 when it enters Harptree at the Highway 607 junction. The southerly direction is necessary to skirt around the southern shores of Willow Bunch Lake. Highway 705 again continues eastward until Km 105.4 when it reaches the Highway 34 junction. At Highway 34, there is a concurrency between Highways 705 and 34. Highway 705 then travels north to a Bengough. After travelling through Bengough, Highway 705 turns east at the junction of Highway 624 which occurs at Km 111.9. At Km 123.2, Highway 705 turns north until Km 124.7. Highway 705 travels mainly east until Km 143.5 when it meets with Highway 622. This junction is located in the RM of The Gap. There is a concurrency created between Highways 622 and 705 in a southerly direction until Km 150.0. At Km 150.0, Highway 705 returns to the eastern bearing and at Km 158.1, reaches the intersection with Highway 6. At Km 176.2, in the RM of Laurier, Highway 705 departs from the easterly route, and turns north until Km 179.3.  From Km 179.3 until Km 184.2, Highway 705 travels east. At Km 184.2 Highway 705 has an intersection with Highway 28.  Highway 705 continues eastward until the next intersection at Km 216.6, with Highway 35 which is in the RM of Lomond near Colgate.  After the intersection, the highway continues east until Km 226.3 where it turns north for a short jaunt. This corner is just north of the village of Goodwater.  At Km 229.6, Highway 705 returns to an easterly course, until Km 241.2 when it turns north. Reaching Halbrite at Km 246.9, Highway 705 travels through the village and reaches the intersection with Highway 39, the CanAm Highway, at Km 247.1. North of Halbrite, Highway 705 turns east at Km 247.7 and reaches the intersection with Highway 606 at Km 257.4. The intersection does not change the course of the highway as it travels east until the terminus at Highway 47 in the RM of Benson.

See also 
Roads in Saskatchewan
Transportation in Saskatchewan

References

External links 

705